"Bloomdido" is a jazz standard written by Charlie Parker. It was originally recorded on 6 June 1950 and was released on the Clef Records album Bird and Diz. French musician Didier Malherbe adopted the title of this piece as his nickname.

See also
List of jazz standards

References

1950s jazz standards
1950 songs
Compositions by Charlie Parker
Jazz compositions in B-flat major